Oleh Teodoziyovych Kudryk (born 17 October 1996) is a Ukrainian professional footballer who plays as a goalkeeper for Polissya Zhytomyr.

Career
Kudryk started playing football at Lviv, then moved to the academy of Shakhtar Donetsk. He performed in the U-19 Championship, which became the bronze and silver medal in two seasons. In the 2014-2015 season, he played for the U-21 team. In 2016 he was part of the senior team.

He made his debut for Shakhtar Donetsk in the Ukrainian Premier League in a match against Oleksandriya on 31 May 2017.

Career statistics

Club

Honours

Club
Shakhtar
Ukrainian Premier League: 2016–17, 2017–18, 2018–19
Ukrainian Cup: 2016–17, 2017–18, 2018–19
Ukrainian Super Cup: 2017

References

External links
 
 

1996 births
Living people
Sportspeople from Lviv
Ukrainian footballers
Association football goalkeepers
FC Shakhtar Donetsk players
FC Karpaty Lviv players
FC Mariupol players
FC Polissya Zhytomyr players
Ukrainian Premier League players
Ukrainian First League players